Ajay Kumar Saroj (born 1 May 1997) is an Indian middle-distance runner. He won gold medals in the 1500 m event at the 2016 South Asian Games and the 2017 Asian Athletics Championships. He also won Gold medal in 1500 m event at South Asian Games 2019

Saroj is the youngest of three brothers, and has three sisters. His father is a farmer and his mother is a housewife. He took up athletics at age 15.

Life 
Ajay Kumar Saroj hails from Allahabad, Uttar Pradesh. Noticing his lack of interest in academics, his family encouraged him to take up sport at a young age. An avid learner, he used to watch the Olympic Games on television to learn the nuances of athletics. Beginning his career on track with 400m, Saroj, on the suggestion of his coach, shifted his focus to 1500m & 800m. 

He is currently supported by the GoSports Foundation through the GoSports Long Term Athlete Development Programme.

References

Indian male middle-distance runners
1997 births
Living people
South Asian Games gold medalists for India
South Asian Games bronze medalists for India
South Asian Games medalists in athletics